Rhyfelwr is the debut album by the Welsh rock band Crys. It was released in 1981 on the Sain record label and was available on LP and Cassette. It is no longer in print.

Track listing 
Roc a Rol
Mwg
Cnau
Can Lis
Dyma'r Band Cymraeg
Nos Sadwrn
Noson Dawel Iawn
Rhyfelwr

Credits 
Liam Forde (Vocals, Rhythm Guitar)
Scott Forde (Bass)
Nicky Samuel (Drums)
Alun Morgan (Lead Guitar)

Crys albums
1981 albums
Welsh-language albums